Michael Eric Heaver (born 22 September 1989) is a British former politician. He was elected as a Brexit Party Member of the European Parliament (MEP) for the East of England constituency in the 2019 European parliamentary election a role he remained in until the United Kingdom's withdrawal from the EU. Previously, he was the chair of the UK Independence Party (UKIP)'s youth wing, Young Independence.

Early life
Michael Eric Heaver was born on 22 September 1989 in Cambridge, Cambridgeshire. His early education was at Coleridge Community College and Hills Road Sixth Form College in Cambridge. He appeared on the panel of the BBC's topical debate programme Question Time on 10 July 2008, at the age of 18, after winning the people's panellist competition. In 2011, Heaver graduated from the University of East Anglia with a bachelor's degree in European Politics.

Political career
Heaver joined the UK Independence Party at the age of 17. He twice served as the chair of their youth wing, Young Independence, and stood as a candidate for the party in the 2014 European parliamentary election in the East of England constituency. He also ran UKIP candidate Tim Aker's unsuccessful campaign for the Thurrock constituency in the 2015 general election.

Heaver formerly served as Nigel Farage's press officer from June 2015 until January 2017, when he resigned and launched the website, Westmonster.  It was modelled on American right-wing websites, like Breitbart News or Drudge Report. Political donor Arron Banks backed the website. It is now defunct and the company behind it was struck off the Companies Register in 2020. In 2018, he appeared on the far-right American conspiracy theory and fake news website Infowars with alt-right conspiracy theorist Paul Joseph Watson. Later in the year, Heaver left UKIP and joined the Conservative Party.

He stood as a candidate for the Brexit Party in the 2019 European parliamentary election. Heaver was second on his party's list behind chairman Richard Tice, and was elected as one of its three MEPs in the East of England constituency. In the European Parliament, he was a member of the Committee on Budgetary Control and was part of the delegation for relations with the Korean Peninsula.

On 26 September 2019, Heaver was announced as the Brexit Party's prospective parliamentary candidate for the Castle Point constituency in Essex. However, on 11 November 2019, the party announced that it would not stand in incumbent Conservative seats.

Heaver has a YouTube channel which has over 70,000 subscribers.

References

External links 

 European Parliament Biography

1989 births
Living people
Alumni of the University of East Anglia
Brexit Party MEPs
MEPs for England 2019–2020
People from Essex
People from Cambridge
People from Cambridgeshire